Arts & Entertainment is a collaborative studio album by American rappers Masta Ace and Edo G. It was released on October 6, 2009 via M3 Records. Recording sessions took place at Dojo II Studios in New York City and at Nelly Protoolz. Production was handled by DJ Supreme One, M-Phazes, Baby Dooks, DJ Spinna, Double-O, Frank Dukes, Pav Bundy and Rain. It features guest appearances from The Bundies, Chester French, DoItAll of Lords of the Underground, KRS-One, Large Professor, Marsha Ambrosius, Posdnuos and Lite. The album was met with generally favorable reviews from music critics.

Track listing

Personnel

Duval "Masta Ace" Clear – vocals, mixing
Edward "Ed O.G." Anderson – vocals
Tara "Jamelle Bundy" Jones – additional vocals (tracks: 2, 9), vocals (track 16)
William "Large Professor" Mitchell – vocals (track 3)
Marsha Ambrosius – vocals (track 4)
Kelvin "Posdnuos" Mercer – vocals (track 9)
Light/Lite – additional vocals (track 9)
Lawrence "KRS-One" Parker – vocals (track 11)
Dupré "DoItAll" Kelly – vocals (track 13)
Chester French – vocals (track 18)
Paris "Pav Bundy" Wells – vocals & producer (track 18)
Mark "M-Phazes" Landon – producer (tracks: 2, 6, 12)
Serge "DJ Supreme One" Aronov – producer (tracks: 3, 7, 13), scratches (track 11)
David "Baby Dooks" Vurdelja – producer (track 4)
Vincent "DJ Spinna" Williams – producer (track 9)
Michael "Double-O" Aguilar – producer (track 11)
Adam "Frank Dukes" Feeney – producer (track 15)
RJ "Rain" Rixey – producer (track 16)
Filthy Rich – recording, mixing
Rick Essig – mastering
Robert Alphonse – art direction
A. Garcia – photography

References

External links

2009 albums
Ed O.G. albums
Masta Ace albums
Collaborative albums
Albums produced by M-Phazes
Albums produced by DJ Spinna
Albums produced by Frank Dukes